Bill "Snow" Telford was a New Zealand rugby league player and coach who coached his country several times, including in the 1957 World Cup.

Playing career
Telford played for the Richmond club in the Auckland Rugby League competition.

In 1928 Telford played for Glebe in the NSWRL Premiership.

Coaching career
In 1948 Telford managed the Auckland side for coach Stan Prentice.

Telford first coached New Zealand between 1956 and 1957, leading the 1956 tour of Australia and coaching the team at the 1957 World Cup.

He advised the West Coast when they traveled to Auckland in 1960.

His second spell as head coach of the Kiwis was between 1961 and 1963 and included the 1961 tour of Great Britain and France and the 1963 tour of Australia.

Telfords final spell as head coach came in 1965 when he led the tour of Great Britain and France. Telford finished his New Zealand coaching career with 8 Test victories, 3 draws and 17 losses.

References

Glebe rugby league players
New Zealand rugby league players
New Zealand rugby league coaches
New Zealand national rugby league team coaches
Ponsonby Ponies coaches
Richmond Bulldogs players
Year of birth missing
Year of death missing